Sedilia compacta is a species of sea snail, a marine gastropod mollusk in the family Drilliidae.

Description

Distribution
This marine species occurs in the Caribbean Sea and is endemic to Belize.

References

 Faber M.J. (2011) A new species of Sedilia from Belize (Gastropoda: Turridae: Drilliinae). Miscellanea Malacologica 5(1): 22

compacta
Gastropods described in 2011